Noah Chidiebere Junior Anyanwu Ohio (born 16 January 2003) is a Dutch professional footballer who plays as a forward for Belgian First Division A club Standard Liège. Born in Almere, he has represented both the Netherlands and England at youth level.

Club career
Born in the Netherlands, Ohio joined Manchester United in 2015 before joining Manchester City the following year. In June 2019, he agreed to join the youth academy of Bundesliga side RB Leipzig. In January 2021, Ohio joined Eredivisie side Vitesse on an 18-month loan deal. On 27 January 2021, he made his professional debut, coming on as a late substitute in a defeat against VVV-Venlo.

Standard Liège 
On 14 July 2022, Ohio joined Standard Liège on a four year contract.

International career
Ohio was born in the Netherlands to Nigerian parents, and moved to England at a young age. Ohio is eligible to play for Nigeria, England and the Netherlands at international level. He played for Netherlands U15 in 2018 before representing both England and the Netherlands at under-16 level the following year.

References

External links

2003 births
Living people
Dutch people of Nigerian descent
English people of Nigerian descent
Dutch emigrants to England
Footballers from Almere
Dutch footballers
English footballers
Association football forwards
Netherlands youth international footballers
England youth international footballers
RB Leipzig players
SBV Vitesse players
FK Austria Wien players
Standard Liège players
Eredivisie players
Bundesliga players
Austrian Football Bundesliga players
Belgian Pro League players
Dutch expatriate sportspeople in Germany
Dutch expatriate sportspeople in Austria
Dutch expatriate sportspeople in Belgium
Expatriate footballers in Germany
Expatriate footballers in Austria
Expatriate footballers in Belgium
Challenger Pro League players